Apoballis is a genus of plants in the  Araceae. It is native to Southeast Asia, primarily the Island of Sumatra in Indonesia. Some authorities regard this group as part of the larger genus Schismatoglottis.

Apoballis acuminatissima (Schott) S.Y.Wong & P.C.Boyce - Sumatra
Apoballis belophylla (Alderw.) S.Y.Wong & P.C.Boyce - Sumatra
Apoballis brevipes (Hook.f.) S.Y.Wong & P.C.Boyce - Sumatra, Thailand, Peninsular Malaysia
Apoballis grandiflora (Alderw.) S.Y.Wong & P.C.Boyce - Sumatra
Apoballis hastifolia (Hallier f. ex Engl.) S.Y.Wong & P.C.Boyce - Sumatra
Apoballis javanica (Engl.) S.Y.Wong & P.C.Boyce - Java
Apoballis longicaulis (Ridl.) S.Y.Wong & P.C.Boyce - Sumatra
Apoballis mutata (Scort. ex Hook.f.) S.Y.Wong & P.C.Boyce - Myanmar, Sumatra, Thailand, Peninsular Malaysia
Apoballis okadae (M.Hotta) S.Y.Wong & P.C.Boyce - Sumatra
Apoballis ovata (Schott) S.Y.Wong & P.C.Boyce - Sumatra
Apoballis rupestris (Zoll. & Moritzi) S.Y.Wong & P.C.Boyce - Sumatra, Java, Bali, Lombok, Timor
Apoballis sagittifolia (Alderw.) S.Y.Wong & P.C.Boyce - Sumatra

References

Aroideae
Araceae genera